Bernard John Darre (November 8, 1939 – April 26, 2006) was an American football guard in the National Football League for the Washington Redskins.  He played college football at Tulane University and was drafted in the 15th round of the 1960 NFL Draft.

1939 births
2006 deaths
American football offensive guards
Players of American football from New Orleans
Tulane Green Wave football players
Washington Redskins players